Khichdi, or Khichri, is a South Asian rice and lentil dish.

Khichdi may also refer to:

 Khichdi (franchise), Hindi language franchise of sitcoms and film
 Khichdi (2002 TV series), 2002 Indian TV series
 Khichdi: The Movie, 2010 Bollywood comedy film
 Khichdi (2018 TV series), 2018 Indian TV series

See also
 
 Kichadi, a Sadhya meal served for Onam
 Khichra, a variation of the dish haleem